The Republicans group, formerly the Union for a Popular Movement group, is a parliamentary group in the National Assembly including representatives of The Republicans (LR), formerly the Union for a Popular Movement.

History 
The group was formed in the National Assembly of the 12th legislature of the French Fifth Republic on 25 June 2002 with 356 deputies following the legislative elections under the name of the Union for the Presidential Majority group (groupe de l'Union pour la majorité présidentielle), and was renamed to the Union for a Popular Movement group (groupe de l'Union pour un mouvement populaire) in line with that of its associated party on 5 March 2003. The group was subsequently reformed on 26 June 2007 with 314 members and 6 related following the legislative elections, and again on 26 June 2012 with 185 members and 11 related after legislative elections. On 2 June 2015, the name of the group was changed to The Republicans group (groupe Les Républicains) following the renaming of the party to The Republicans.

The UMP group in the National Assembly was initially presided over by Jacques Barrot after his election unopposed on 19 June 2002, who later resigned to serve on the European Commission following Michel Barnier. Bernard Accoyer was elected unopposed on 4 May 2004 to replace him, serving until June 2007, after which successfully sought to become president of the National Assembly and replaced by Jean-François Copé. After Copé became General Secretary of the UMP, Christian Jacob was elected to succeed him on 23 November 2010. Jacob was re-elected most recently on 21 June 2017, collecting 62 votes against Damien Abad, who received 32 votes.

In the 2017 legislative elections, only 112 deputies under the label of the Republicans were elected, a "historic reversal" for the party, with the right and centre registering its worst score in the history of the Fifth Republic, the previous record being 158 deputies in the 1981 legislative elections. With the election of Emmanuel Macron and appointment of three right-wing ministers to his government, divisions in the right re-emerged, with a number of "constructives" interested in supporting his project. On 21 June, Thierry Solère announced the creation of a common group with the Union of Democrats and Independents (UDI) likely to contain 18 UDI and about 15 LR deputies. The formation of two parliamentary groups on the right represented a symbolic divorce to the two threads on the right (moderates and hardliners) and the end of the old UMP, created in 2002 to unite the right and centre.

On 27 June, Virginie Duby-Muller, Damien Abad, Valérie Lacroute, Véronique Louwagie, Frédérique Meunier, François Cornut-Gentille, Julien Aubert, Gérard Cherpion, Arnaud Viala, Guillaume Peltier, and Gilles Lurton were designated as the group's vice presidents. At the time of its formation on 27 June, the parliamentary group included 100 deputies, including 5 associated members.

On 8 December, the constitutional council annulled the election of Ian Boucard in Territoire de Belfort's 1st constituency due to the distribution of misleading electoral leaflets by the candidate; as a result, a by-election was held to fill the vacant seat in 2018, and Boucard was re-elected. The constitutional council subsequently annulled the election of Jean-Pierre Door, who won by 8 votes in Loiret's 4th constituency, on 18 December, triggering a by-election. Marine Brenier left the UDI, Agir and Independents group to rejoin the LR group on 23 January 2018, and Boucard won the by-election in Territoire de Belfort, and joined the group together with Antoine Savignat after he won the by-election in Val-d'Oise.

Splinter factions 

 Rassemblement-UMP group (2012 to 2013)

List of presidents

Historical membership

See also 

The Republicans group (Senate)

References

External links 
 Notices and portraits of deputies 
 Changes in the composition of groups 

National Assembly (France)
Parliamentary groups in France
The Republicans (France)